Space Micro Inc is an American company that designs and manufactures high-reliability space and satellite subsystems. Space Micro focuses on radiation-hardened Single Board Computers,  Image Processing Computers, Software Defined Radios, Radio Frequency Transceivers and Transponders, Optical Terminals, Space Cameras, Star Trackers and Sun Sensors. 

Space Micro leverages commercial technologies, and modifies these to meet defense, scientific and commercial space requirements.

History 
Space Micro was founded in 2002 by David J. Strobel and David Czajkowski as their second entrepreneurial venture following the successful sale of their first company, Space Electronics, Inc., to Maxwell Technologies in 1999.

Since 2002, the company has designed, manufactured and launched hundreds of subsystems into space, accumulating millions of hours of space flight heritage.  Subsystems have flown on spacecraft for NASA (LADEE, IRIS, TESS), JPL, Department of Defense, aerospace primes (Lockheed Martin, Boeing) as well as Airbus, ULA, Dynetics, Moog, Raytheon, and commercial space entities such as Astrobotic and Astroscale.

In 2022, Space Micro was acquired by Voyager Space Holdings.

Facility 
Space Micro headquarters comprise offices, laboratories and manufacturing  in a 43,000 sq. ft. facility in San Diego, CA.  Design, fabrication, testing and qualification are completed at this facility which includes seven clean rooms, digital, optical, radio frequency and lasercom labs, as well as environmental test labs and equipment such as TVACs, Thermal Cycling, Vibe Tables, Temperature and Thermal Cycling.

Accomplishments 

 First computer and image-processing subsystem launched to space (2006) within 4 years of their founding in 2002
 Advanced Software Defined Radios (SDRs) were developed for, and flown on, NASA IRIS, LADEE, and TESS.
 Delivered four 3U CubeSat spacecraft with RF payloads for multiple DoD customers.
 Key supplier to many lunar missions ranging from NASA LADEE, Google Lunar X Prize (Beresheet), and NASA  Artemis programs.

Products

Electro-Optics 

Electro-Optics subsystems include space-qualified SpaceCams™ built to withstand harsh environments while delivering high-performance and long-term reliability. SpaceCams will be used on Artemis programs including lunar landers and rovers.  The Electro-Optics product line also includes Star Trackers and Sun Sensors which utilize flight-tested components and proven radiation mitigation techniques. These products are designed to support precise spacecraft attitude determination and space domain awareness, and can be customized for specific orbit and mission life.

Communication Systems 
Communications Systems include the µLCT™ Laser Communication Terminal utilizing dual or single aperture optical head assemblies and providing data rates up to 100 Gbps. A full suite of high-reliability Radio Frequency (RF) products includes mission-proven SGLS, STDN and X-Band Transponders, X-, Ku-, and Ka-Band Mission Data Transmitters, Nanocom™ Software Defined Radios, RF Beacons and Solid State Power Amplifiers.

Digital Systems 
Digital Systems include Single Board Computers and Multi-Core Space Processors, as well as the modular and configurable ProtonX-Box™ Avionics platform and versatile digital slices. Image Processing Computers are in-flight configurable and engineered to process high-speed optical or sensor data, store and make data available to downlink.

External links 
Space Micro Inc website

Companies established in 2002
Companies based in San Diego
Technology companies of the United States
2002 establishments in California